Eliza Madelina Wilbur Souvielle (October 21, 1851 – March 31, 1930) was a prominent scientist, astronomer, botanist, inventor, author and publisher.

She studied at Batavia Female Seminary in New York and may have been the first female to lecture in science at Harvard University. She was a member of the American Association for the Advancement of Science and her work was published in magazines and newspapers including Scientific American and the New York Herald. She published Continuity (magazine).

Wilbur married Thomas Basnett and moved to Marabanong in 1880. After his death in 1886 she married Frenchman Mathieu Souvielle, a throat and lung surgeon.

She wrote Sequel to the Parliament of Religion about non-Western religions under the pseudonym Eban Malcolm Sutcliffe and The Ulyssiad (Dacosta Publishing Co. of Jacksonville, 1896), a biography of Ulysses Grant in verse. She was active in the women's suffrage campaign, served as secretary for the Home for the Aged in Jacksonville for seven years, and was vice president of the Jacksonville Branch of the League of American Pen Women. Her patents included three for telescopes. She was also involved in efforts to engineer an airplane.

References

1851 births
1930 deaths
American women astronomers
Women inventors